"Angel Baby" is a song by Australian singer-songwriter Troye Sivan. Released on 13 October 2021 via EMI, Universal and Capitol Records, "Angel Baby" is the lead single from Sivan's upcoming third studio album and his first solo release of new material since "Rager Teenager!" in August 2020.

Background
Sivan first announced the single on 27 August 2021 through social media posts, stating "surprise gushy juicy doting adoring power bottom gay ballad 'Angel Baby' out oct 13". It followed "You", a track by Regard which was released in April 2021, featured Sivan and Tate McRae, and reached number one on the US Dance Club Songs chart, becoming Sivan's third number one on a Billboard chart after "Youth" and "My My My!" topped the chart.

Speaking to NME, Sivan explained that the song is his "his crack at an adoring, doting, love struck, mega pop, gay, power ballad. I thought we needed a few more of those".

Composition
The song was written by Sivan, James Abrahart, Jason Evigan, Sarah Hudson and Michael Pollack. Lyrically, it features Sivan confessing to his lover that he has saved him, stating that he "almost died, but you're bringing me back to life". In the chorus he confesses that he wants to "stay in this moment forever" because he is "afraid living couldn't get any better", and that his lover has sacrificed a lot to be with him and has "gave up heaven so we could be together, declaring him his "angel baby".

Cover artwork
The official cover art for the single features a shirtless Sivan staring at the ground while wearing jeans and a white jockstrap. He is standing against a cloudy blue sky and has a small pair of neon angel wings on his back. Other promotional images released in the lead-up to the track's debut were similarly themed, including a black and white photograph of Sivan wearing tight silver leather trousers sitting on a fence with huge, feathery white wings and a black and white close-up of Sivan wearing a white top in the shower also being used to advertise the song.

Music video
A visualiser featuring Sivan dancing around shirtless, wearing large angel wings and looking into the camera was released to accompany the song on 13 October 2021 and was directed by Lucas Chemotti. A music video for "Angel Baby" directed by Luke Gilford was released on 21 October.

Reception
Reviews of the track have praised the song's "yearning and romance" and described it as a "nostalgia-soaked love ballad", with "cinematic 90s synth glory".

Charts

Weekly charts

Year-end charts

Release history

References

2020s ballads
2021 songs
2021 singles
Troye Sivan songs
Songs written by Troye Sivan
Songs written by Michael Pollack (musician)
LGBT-related songs
Number-one singles in Malaysia
Number-one singles in the Philippines
Pop ballads
Songs written by Sarah Hudson (singer)
Songs written by James Abrahart
Songs written by Jason Evigan